This is a list of educational institutions located in the district of Sahiwal in Pakistan.

Primary and secondary educational institutions & Colleges
University of Sahiwal
Sahiwal Medical College
Punjab College of Science
The Superior College
Quaid-e-Azam College of Engineering and Technology, Sahiwal, 
CFE Group of Colleges
Army Public Schools & Colleges System
Govt High School 82-6/R Sahiwal
Beaconhouse School System
Bloomfield Hall School
The City School
Divisional Public School and College
The Educators
Govt High School Urban Area Sahiwal
Maarifa College

References

External links

Sahiwal
Sahiwal